The 2010–11 Football League One (known as Npower League One for sponsorship reasons) was the seventh season of the league under its current title and nineteenth season under its current league division format. It started on 7 August 2010.

Changes from 2009–10

Team changes

From League One
Promoted to Championship
 Norwich City
 Leeds United
 Millwall
Relegated to League Two
 Southend United
 Wycombe Wanderers
 Stockport County
 Gillingham

To League One
Relegated from Championship
 Sheffield Wednesday
 Plymouth Argyle
 Peterborough United
Promoted from League Two
 Notts County
 Rochdale
 Bournemouth
 Dagenham & Redbridge

Rule changes

On field rules
 Clubs are now restricted to having 25 first-team players over the age of 21, of which 10 must be home grown (registered in domestic football for three seasons before their 21st birthday). There is no restriction to players under 21.

Off field rules
 The new financial reporting rules will see clubs that fail to lodge their accounts with the Football League, at the same time they are required by Companies House, being hit with a transfer embargo.
 The Football League's Fit and Proper Person test was renamed "Director's Test" to ensure continuity with other football bodies.

Sponsorship changes
Npower will be the Football League's new sponsor after Coca-Cola's contract ran out and was not renewed. The "Player of the Month" and "Manager of the Month" awards will now been known as the "Npower Player of the Month" and the "Npower Manager of the Month" award respectively. Coca-Cola signed a three-year contract to become the Football League's official partner.

Team overview

Stadiums and locations

Personnel and sponsoring

Managerial changes

Ownership changes

League table
A total of 24 teams contest the division, including 17 sides remaining in the division from last season, three relegated from the Championship, and four promoted from League Two.

Play-offs

Semifinals

Huddersfield Town 4–4 Bournemouth on aggregate. Huddersfield Town won 4–2 on penalties.

Peterborough United won 4–3 on aggregate.

Final

Results

Season statistics

Top scorers

Top assists

Scoring
First goal of the season: 46 minutes and 17 seconds – Luke Summerfield for Plymouth Argyle against Southampton (7 August 2010).
Highest scoring game: 9 goals – Peterborough United 5–4 Swindon Town (16 October 2010)
Most goals scored in a game by one team: 6 goals
 Sheffield Wednesday 6–2 Bristol Rovers (11 December 2010)
 Oldham Athletic 0–6 Southampton (11 January 2011)
 Walsall 6–1 Bristol Rovers (29 January 2011)
 Peterborough United 6-0 Carlisle United (12 March 2011)
Widest winning margin: 6 goals
 Oldham Athletic 0–6 Southampton (11 January 2011)
 Peterborough United 6-0 Carlisle United (12 March 2011)
Fewest games failed to score in: 4 – Peterborough United
Most games failed to score in: 20 – Hartlepool United

Discipline
Most yellow cards (club): 85 – Tranmere Rovers
Most yellow cards (player): 13
 Luke Ayling (Yeovil Town)
 Joss Labadie (Tranmere Rovers)
Most red cards (club): 12 – Plymouth Argyle
Most red cards (player): 3
 Christian Dailly (Chartlon Athletic)
 Gary MacKenzie (Milton Keynes Dons)
Most fouls (club): 594 – Notts County
Most fouls (Player): 86 – Joss Labadie (Tranmere Rovers)

Clean sheets
Most clean sheets: 20 – Brighton & Hove Albion and Southampton
Fewest clean sheets: 6 - Dagenham & Redbridge

Monthly awards

References

 
EFL League One seasons
2010–11 Football League
3
Eng